Internet Protocol Video Market (IPVM) is a security and surveillance industry research group and trade publication based in Bethlehem, Pennsylvania that focuses on reviewing and reporting on video surveillance technology.

IPVM was launched in 2008 out of Hawaii, when founder John Honovich had left the surveillance industry after becoming disillusioned with what he described as "overstated marketing claims" that pervaded the industry. Soon after launching, IPVM's headquarters moved to Pennsylvania, where most of its employees were living. The website began as a news aggregator, though the company would grow to produce original investigations and conduct its own reviews of surveillance equipment. Throughout most of its history, the publication's readership and reach has been specific to the surveillance industry.

PVM gained broader recognition in 2020 and 2021 for its investigative reporting revealing how PRC-based technology firms Alibaba, Dahua Technology, Huawei and Megvii filed patents for face detection technology designed to target Uyghurs. The company's investigations on surveillance equipment used in China have been widely cited by major newspapers in the United States, including The Wall Street Journal, The New York Times, and The Washington Post. Its reports have drawn the ire of Chinese video surveillance equipment company Hikvision, whom IPVM revealed to have been providing surveillance equipment and technology key in the mass internment of ethnic minorities in Xinjiang. China has been critical of the company, blocking the company's website within Great Firewall, while the Ministry of Foreign Affairs of the People's Republic of China has denied the validity of IPVM's work relating to Huawei, claiming it was "slander".

Unlike many trade publications focused on the surveillance industry, IPVM does not accept advertising from manufacturers of surveillance technology, owing to its founder's concern around the potential for advertisers to affect the publication's editorial independence.

History
IPVM was launched in 2008 out of Hawaii, when founder John Honovich had left the surveillance industry after becoming disillusioned with what he described as "overstated marketing claims" that pervaded the industry. Soon after launching, IPVM's headquarters moved to Pennsylvania, where most of its employees were living. The website began as a news aggregator, though the company would grow to produce original investigations and conduct its own reviews of surveillance equipment. However, the publication would begin to gain notoriety more broadly following its investigations into Chinese surveillance firms. After publishing reports critical of Chinese video surveillance firms Hikvision and Dahua Technology, the Chinese government blocked IPVM behind its Great Firewall on October 19, 2018. Reporters Without Borders subsequently condemned the Chinese government’s decision.

In December 2019, IPVM would move again, leaving its headquarters in Lehigh County, Pennsylvania for a  research facility in the residential Miller Heights neighborhood Bethlehem, Pennsylvania. The new location allows IPVM to conduct on-site video surveillance hardware and software tests on products from a variety of leading video surveillance manufacturers. In March 2021, the Journal of Biomedical Optics published a study by five IPVM researchers and a U.S. military medical service officer on the problems with COVID-19 fever screening devices. The study was funded by IPVM and was conducted at the new facility.

China technology companies' involvement in Uyghur genocide

In May 2021, the BBC aired Are You Scared Yet, Human?, a Panorama documentary featuring an interview with IPVM on Dahua Technology's, Hikvision's, and Huawei's roles in developing mass surveillance technologies in China, including technological products designed to identify Uyghurs. In September 2021, IPVM presented an expert statement to the Uyghur Tribunal in the United Kingdom.

In 2022, IPVM, in association with Ethan Gutmann from the Victims of Communism Memorial Foundation and Bob Fu from ChinaAid, among others, helped Ovalbek Turdakun, a Kyrgyz Christian Xinjiang internment camps survivor, escape to the United States, where he was granted significant public benefit parole. Turdakun gave first-person witness testimony about his alleged detention during an April press conference led by IPVM's Conor Healy and the Victims of Communism Memorial Foundation.

Joint investigations
In 2020, The Washington Post and IPVM jointly reported on Huawei's testing of facial recognition technology designed to identify Uyghurs.

In 2021, IPVM partnered with TechCrunch to examine U.S. local governments' purchases and U.S. retailers' sales of surveillance equipment manufactured by companies linked to Uyghur abuses as well as with The Intercept to investigate the U.S. military's purchase of sanctioned cameras for the U.S. embassy in Caracas.

In 2022, IPVM partnered with the MIT Technology Review to examine an Israeli company's plan to develop DNA-based facial recognition and was cited in an ESPN exposé on Brooklyn Nets owner Joseph Tsai discussing Alibaba's, Megvii's and SenseTime's Uyghur-targeting software.

Reaction

Hikvision
In July 2021, Hikvision resigned its membership in the Security Industry Association, a U.S.-based trade association, citing in its resignation letter that it had been "harassed and maligned" by IPVM. Hikvision further claimed that IPVM had engaged in "unethical hacking" of its cameras and that IPVM had published "misleading blog stories."

In January 2022, Axios reported that Hikvision had asked U.S. congressional ethics officials to investigate potential lobbying disclosure violations by IPVM. U.S. senator Marco Rubio and congresswoman Claudia Tenney retweeted the Axios article, urging their congressional colleagues to ignore Hikvision while claiming that Hikvision's accusations against IPVM amounted to censorship.

Chinese state media
In November 2021, Global Times, a tabloid under the auspices of the Chinese Communist Party, published an article by Gao Lei writing under the pen name 耿直哥, or Candid Brother, to its Baidu and WeChat accounts criticizing IPVM as a U.S. government mouthpiece parading as a civilian company. Lei also compared IPVM founder John Honovich to German anthropologist Adrian Zenz and claimed that another IPVM employee is "a rather extreme white right-winger."

In January 2022, China Daily, a Chinese Communist Party-owned newspaper, published an article and a video noting IPVM's work with the BBC, The New York Times, Reuters, and The Washington Post, criticizing it as a "mass surveillance company" that has "been sharing tons of data they have collected on Xinjiang and on other Chinese entities."

References 

American news websites
American technology news websites
Companies based in Bethlehem, Pennsylvania
Companies based in Northampton County, Pennsylvania
Global surveillance
Internet properties established in 2008
Investigative journalism
Security technology
Video surveillance